Odds Against Tomorrow is a 1959 film noir produced and directed by Robert Wise and starring Harry Belafonte. Belafonte selected Abraham Polonsky to write the script, which is based on a novel of the same name by William P. McGivern. Blacklisted in those years, Polonsky had to use a front and John O. Killens was credited. Polonsky's screenwriting credit was restored in 1996 in his own name.

Plot
David Burke is a former policeman who was ruined when he refused to cooperate with state crime investigators. He asks Earle Slater, a tough ex-con and racist, to help him rob a bank, promising him $50,000 if the robbery is successful. Burke also recruits Johnny Ingram, a nightclub entertainer, who doesn't want the job but who is addicted to gambling and deeply in debt.

Slater, who is supported by his girlfriend Lorry, learns that Ingram is black and refuses the job. Later, he realizes that he needs the money, and joins Ingram and Burke in the enterprise. Tensions between Ingram and Slater increase as they near completion of the crime.

On the night of the robbery, the three crooks are able to enter the bank and abscond with stolen money. Burke is seen by a police officer when leaving the scene of the raid and is gunned down in the ensuing shootout. He then shoots himself to avoid capture. Slater and Ingram fight each other while evading the police. They escape and run to a fuel storage depot, chasing each other onto the top of the fuel tanks. When they exchange gunfire, the fuel tanks ignite, causing a large explosion. Later, when police survey the scene, Slater's and Ingram's burned corpses are indistinguishable from each other. The film ends with a shot of a sign at the entrance of the depot reading "STOP—DEAD END".

Cast
 Harry Belafonte as Johnny Ingram
 Robert Ryan as Earl Slater
 Shelley Winters as Lorry
 Ed Begley as David Burke
 Gloria Grahame as Helen
 Will Kuluva as Bacco
 Kim Hamilton as Ruth
 Mae Barnes as Annie
 Richard Bright as Coco
 Carmen De Lavallade as Kitty
 Lew Gallo as Moriarty
 Lois Thorne as Eadie
 Wayne Rogers Soldier in bar
 Zohra Lampert as Girl in Bar
 Allen Nourse as Police Chief

Production
The film was produced by HarBel Productions, a company founded by the film's star, Harry Belafonte. He selected Abraham Polonsky as the screenwriter. Polonsky was blacklisted by the House Unamerican Activities Committee at the time, which had conducted extensive hearings on communist influence in the film industry. He used John O. Killens, a black novelist and friend of Belafonte, as a front to be the credited screenwriter. In 1996, the Writers Guild of America restored Polonsky's film credit under his own name.

Principal photography began in March 1959. All outdoor scenes were shot in New York City and Hudson, New York. According to director Robert Wise:

I did something in Odds Against Tomorrow I'd been wanting to do in some pictures but hadn't had the chance. I wanted a certain kind of mood in some sequences, such as the opening when Robert Ryan is walking down West Side Street...I used infra-red film. You have to be very careful with that because it turns green things white, and you can't get too close on people's faces. It does distort them but gives that wonderful quality—black skies with white clouds—and it changes the feeling and look of the scenes.

This film was the last in which Wise shot black-and-white film in the standard aspect ratio. This technique "gave his films the gritty realism they were known for."  After this film, Wise shot two black-and-white films, both in the cinemascope (2.35:1) aspect ratio: Two for the Seesaw and The Haunting.

Musical score and soundtrack

The film score was composed, arranged and conducted by John Lewis of the Modern Jazz Quartet. The soundtrack album was released on the United Artists label in 1959. To realize his score, Lewis assembled a 22-piece orchestra, which included MJQ bandmates Milt Jackson on vibraphone, Percy Heath on bass, Connie Kay on drums, Bill Evans on piano and Jim Hall on guitar. 
AllMusic's Bruce Eder noted "This superb jazz score by John Lewis was later turned into a hit by The Modern Jazz Quartet. It's dark and dynamic, and a classic." The Modern Jazz Quartet's album of Lewis' themes, Music from Odds Against Tomorrow, was recorded in October 1959. The track "Skating in Central Park" became a permanent part of the MJQ's repertoire. It was reused for a similar scene in the 1971 film Little Murders.

Track listing
All compositions by John Lewis
 "Prelude to Odds Against Tomorrow" - 1:44
 "A Cold Wind Is Blowing" - 1:20
 "Five Figure People Crossing Paths" - 1:40
 "How to Frame Pigeons" - 1:04
 "Morning Trip to Melton" - 3:09
 "Looking at the Caper" - 2:01
 "Johnny Ingram's Possessions" - 1:08
 "The Carousel Incident" - 1:44
 "Skating in Central Park" - 3:29
 "No Happiness for Slater" - 3:56
 "Main Theme: Odds Against Tomorrow" - 3:24
 "Games" - 2:17 	
 "Social Call" - 3:53 	
 "The Impractical Man - 3:00
 Advance on Melton"- 1:58
 "Waiting Around the River" - 3:51
 "Distractions" - 1:25
 "The Caper Failure" - 1:23
 "Postlude" - 0:45

Personnel
John Lewis - arrange, conducto
Bernie Glow, Joe Wilder, John Ware, Melvyn Broiles - trumpet
John Clark, Tom McIntosh - trombone
Al Richman, Gunther Schuller, Paul Ingram, Ray Alonge - French horn
Harvey Phillips - tuba
Robert DiDomenica - flute
Harvey Shapiro, Joseph Tekula - cello
Ruth Berman - harp
Milt Jackson - vibraphone
Bill Evans - piano
Jim Hall - guitar
Percy Heath - bass
Connie Kay - drums]
Richard Horowitz - timpani
Walter Rosenberger - percussion

Reception

Critical response
The film has an 88% rating on Rotten Tomatoes. Bosley Crowther of the New York Times described Wise's direction as "tight and strong" and the film as a "sharp, hard, suspenseful melodrama," with a "sheer dramatic build-up...of an artistic caliber that is rarely achieved on the screen."

Time magazine wrote:

The tension builds well to the climax—thanks partly to Director Robert Wise (I Want to Live!), partly to an able Negro scriptwriter named John O. Killens, but mostly to Actor Ryan, a menace who can look bullets and smile sulphuric acid. But the tension is released too soon—and much too trickily. The spectator is left with a feeling that is aptly expressed in the final frame of the film, when the camera focuses on a street sign that reads: STOP—DEAD END.

Variety wrote: "On one level, Odds against Tomorrow is a taut crime melodrama. On another, it is an allegory about racism, greed and man's propensity for self-destruction. Not altogether successful in the second category, it still succeeds on its first."

Forty years after the film's release, critic Stephen Holden called it "sadly overlooked."

Awards
The film was nominated for a Golden Globe award for Motion Picture Promoting International Understanding.

Books
A book of the screenplay titled  Odds Against Tomorrow: A Critical Edition was published in 1999 by the Center for Telecommunication Studies, sponsored by the Radio-Television-Film department at California State University, Northridge. The book includes the film's complete script, blending the shooting and continuity scripts, and a critical analysis written by CSUN professor John Schultheiss, who conducted interviews with Wise, Belafonte and Polonsky.

Home media
Odds Against Tomorrow was released on DVD by MGM Home Video on December 2, 2003 as a Region 1 full-frame DVD. The film was released on Blu-ray disc by Olive Films on May 29, 2018.

See also
 List of American films of 1959

References

External links
 
 
 
 Odds Against Tomorrow photo gallery at the American Film Institute
 Odds Against Tomorrow essay, "Robert Ryan: Letting the Demons Out" by Jeff Stafford at Turner Classic Movies's Movie Morlocks
 Odds Against Tomorrow film trailer at YouTube
 

1959 films
1959 crime drama films
1950s English-language films
1950s heist films
American black-and-white films
American crime drama films
American heist films
Film noir
Films about bank robbery
Films about racism
Films based on American novels
Films based on crime novels
Films directed by Robert Wise
Films scored by John Lewis
Films set in New York (state)
Films set in New York City
Films shot in New York (state)
Films shot in New York City
United Artists films
1950s American films
Films produced by Robert Wise